De Gerlache Seamounts are seamounts in Antarctica, named for Lieutenant Adrien Victor Joseph de Gerlache (Royal Belgian Navy), Commander of the Belgica during the first Belgian Antarctic Expedition, 1896–1899.

References
 

Seamounts of the Southern Ocean